Ingmar De Poortere (born 27 May 1984 in Ghent) is a Belgian professional racing cyclist for UCI Continental team .

Career highlights

2000
3rd, National U17 Omnium Championship
2001
3rd, National U19 Points race Championship, Ghent
2002
1st, Omloop der Vlaamse Gewesten – U19 version, Duffel
3rd, Ledegem–Kemmel–Ledegem – U19 version, Ledegem
2003
2nd, UIV Cup Ghent, U23 (with Steve Schets)
2005
2nd, National Madison Championship, Ghent
2nd, UIV Cup München, U23 (with Nicky Cocquyt)
3rd, UIV Cup Rotterdam, U23 (with Tim Mertens)
2006
  Team Pursuit Champion, Ghent (with Mertens/Schets/De Ketele)
3rd, Overall, Ronde van Antwerpen
1st, Stage 1, Booischot
2007
  Scratch Champion, Ghent
  Team Pursuit Champion, Ghent (with Mertens/De Ketele/Cornu)
1st, Overall, UIV Cup, U23 (with Tim Mertens)
1st, Rotterdam
1st, Berlin
1st, København
1st, Stage 5a, Volta Ciclista Internacional a Lleida, Lleida
2nd, National Pursuit Championship, Ghent
2nd, National Derny Championship, Ghent
3rd, National Pursuit Championship, Ghent
3rd, National Madison Championship, Ghent (with Davy Tuytens)

References

External links

1984 births
Living people
Belgian male cyclists
Belgian track cyclists
Sportspeople from Ghent
Cyclists from East Flanders